The Vithkuq Hydroelectric Power Station  is a small hydroelectric power station in Vithkuq, Albania. Constructed in 1936, it was the first hydroelectric plant in Albania with an installed capacity of 500 KW.

See also 

 List of power stations in Albania
 Vithkuq

References 

Hydroelectric power stations in Albania